Filimonas lacunae is a Gram-negative, aerobic and motile bacterium from the genus of Filimonas which has been isolated from fresh water from Japan.

References

Further reading 
 

Chitinophagia
Bacteria described in 2009